Matthew Lowe (born 20 October 1990) is an English footballer who plays for Nantwich Town. He plays as a defender.

Career
Born in Stoke-on-Trent, England, Lowe is a central defender who rose through the ranks at Macclesfield Town. He broke into the first team in the 2009–10 season. He not only plays at centre half, but also right back too. His long throws cause problems in opposing penalty areas. In March 2011 he was sent out on loan to Kidderminster Harriers and was released by the Silkmen at the end of the season. In July 2011, Lowe joined Nantwich Town along with striker Ben Mills from Stafford Rangers.

References

External links

Matthew Lowe at MTFC.com

1990 births
Living people
Footballers from Stoke-on-Trent
English footballers
Association football defenders
Macclesfield Town F.C. players
Kidderminster Harriers F.C. players
Nantwich Town F.C. players
English Football League players
National League (English football) players